Geneva Coulter (born January 1, 1999) is a Canadian athlete that participates in women's ice sledge hockey. A member of the Canada women's national ice sledge hockey team, she competed in the first-ever IPC Ice Sledge Hockey Women's International Cup in 2014.

Playing career
Afflicted with Legg-Perthes Disease, Coulter competes at the defense position. When not with the national team, she is a member of the Edmonton Impact, having played alongside fellow national team members such as Alanna Mah and Eri Yamamoto MacDonald.

Canada Women's National Sled Hockey Team
Competing at the IPC Ice Sledge Hockey Women's International Cup from November 7–9, 2014 in Brampton, Ontario, Canada, it marked Coulter’s international debut.

References

1999 births
Living people
Canadian sledge hockey players